The 2003 Women's World Snooker Championship was a women's snooker tournament played in the United Kingdom in 2003. Defending champion Kelly Fisher beat Lisa Quick 4–1 in the final to win the title.

Tournament summary
Defending champion Fisher took a lead of 3–0 in the final at the Crucible Theatre, with breaks of 32, 45 and 90. Quick won the fourth  on the  before Fisher won the fifth to take the match 4–1 and win the world championship for the fifth time in six years.

The highest break of the tournament was 125, by Fisher during qualifying. Quick made a break of 115.

Prize money
Winner (Kelly Fisher): £5,500
Runner-up (Lisa Quick): £2,750
Semi-final losers: £1,500
Quarter-final losers: £600
Losers in the last 16: £200
Losers in the last 32: £100

Main draw
Source: Snooker Scene

Final
Source: Snooker Scene

References

World Women's Snooker Championship
World Women's Championship
World Women's Snooker Championship
World Snooker Championship